Nux Organization is a Japanese record label founded by Zeni Geva frontman KK Null. It has released records by Null and Zeni Geva as well as bands such as Shellac, Melt-Banana, Merzbow and others.

References

See also
 List of record labels

Japanese record labels
Noise music record labels
Experimental music record labels
Alternative rock record labels

fr:Kazuyuki K. Null#NUX Organization